Sutipong Santitevagul (born 8 November 1949) is a Thai fencer. He competed in the individual and team épée and sabre events at the 1976 Summer Olympics.

References

External links
 

1949 births
Living people
Sutipong Santitevagul
Sutipong Santitevagul
Fencers at the 1976 Summer Olympics
Sutipong Santitevagul
Sutipong Santitevagul